Richland Hills is a city in Tarrant County, Texas, United States. The population was 7,801 at the 2010 census.

Government

Richland Hills operates under a charter adopted in 1986, which provides for a "Council-Manager" form of government. The Council is composed of a Mayor and five Council Members elected at large. The Council determines the overall goals and objectives for the city, establishes policies and adopts the city's annual operating budget. Richland Hills is a member of the North Central Texas Council of Governments association.

Geography

Demographics

2020 census

As of the 2020 United States census, there were 8,621 people, 2,798 households, and 1,986 families residing in the city.

2000 census
As of the census of 2000, there were 8,132 people, 3,197 households, and 2,196 families residing in the city. The population density was 2,584.6 people per square mile (996.8/km2). There were 3,334 housing units at an average density of 1,059.6 per square mile (408.7/km2). The racial makeup of the city was 90.41% White, 1.44% African American, 0.61% Native American, 1.01% Asian, 0.27% Pacific Islander, 4.06% from other races, and 2.20% from two or more races. Hispanic or Latino of any race were 10.15% of the population.

There were 3,197 households, out of which 29.7% had children under the age of 18 living with them, 52.9% were married couples living together, 11.5% had a female householder with no husband present, and 31.3% were non-families. 26.4% of all households were made up of individuals, and 12.0% had someone living alone who was 65 years of age or older. The average household size was 2.47 and the average family size was 2.99.

In the city, the population was spread out, with 23.6% under the age of 18, 7.1% from 18 to 24, 27.4% from 25 to 44, 21.7% from 45 to 64, and 20.2% who were 65 years of age or older. The median age was 40 years. For every 100 females, there were 85.9 males. For every 100 females age 18 and over, there were 83.2 males.

The median income for a household in the city was $43,377, and the median income for a family was $50,377. Males had a median income of $35,635 versus $28,066 for females. The per capita income for the city was $20,247. About 3.9% of families and 5.8% of the population were below the poverty line, including 8.2% of those under age 18 and 3.1% of those age 65 or over.

Education
The city of Richland Hills is served by the Birdville Independent School District.

Transportation

Roads

3 State Highways pass through Richland Hills:

 Texas State Highway 183 (Baker Boulevard)
 Texas State Highway 121 (Airport Freeway)
 Texas State Highway 26 (Boulevard 26 / Grapevine Highway)

Public transportation
The city of Richland Hills is served by Mobility Impaired Transportation Service (MITS) and the Richland Hills Station on the Trinity Railway Express commuter rail line.

Culture

Arts and sciences

Nature
Richland Hills is listed with the Texas Historical Commission as being a City on the Texas Lakes Trail.

Retail
There are no shopping malls in Richland Hills, however a regional complex, North East Mall in Hurst, Texas, serves most of the Mid-Cities and Northeastern Tarrant County.

Parks and recreation

There are 5 parks in Richland Hills—Including the city's newest location at 6750 Baker Blvd. This park site, The Link Plaza, hosts a water feature, pavilion and The Link—Event and Recreation Center. The other parks in the system include:

 Kate Baker Park – 3555 Vance Rd.
 Rosebud Park – 2600 Rosebud Ln.
 Creek Trail Park – 3925 Airline Dr.
 Windmill Park – 6936 Park Place Dr.

Notable people

 Boyd Bartley (1920–2012), baseball player; died in Richland Hills
 Paul Dennis Reid (1957–2013), serial killer; born in Richland Hills

References

External links

 City of Richland Hills official website
 Link Event and Recreation Center
 Arts Council Northeast
 Texas Lakes Trail

Dallas–Fort Worth metroplex
Cities in Tarrant County, Texas
Cities in Texas